Khvajeh Hoseyni (also Romanized as Khvājeh Ḩoseynī; also known as Z̧afarābād) is a village in Shaban Rural District, in the Central District of Nahavand County, Hamadan Province, Iran. At the 2006 census, its population was 40, in 11 families.

References 

Populated places in Nahavand County